Hadj Boudella is a citizen of Bosnia who was wrongfully detained for over six years in the United States Guantanamo Bay detainment camps, in Cuba.

He was born in Algeria, moved to Bosnia, married Nađa Dizdarević a Bosnian woman, and became a Bosnian citizen. Boudella, and five associates of his, who were also Algerian-born Bosnians were arrested by Bosnian authorities.  Local United States intelligence officials said they detected "chatter" that implicated the six in a conspiracy to bomb the US embassy in Bosnia.

He won his habeas corpus and US District Court Judge Richard J. Leon wrote that there was no evidence that Boudella intended to travel to Afghanistan to take up arms against US forces. Judge Leon declared Boudella's detention as unlawful and ordered his release in November 2008. He was released from Guantanamo and returned to his family in Bosnia on December 16, 2008.

Wife hunger strike

In June 2005, Boudella's wife, Nađa Dizdarević, started the first of several hunger strikes to protest her husbands detention at Guantanamo Bay, Cuba.  She said she would end her hunger strike only when she received written confirmation from Bosnia's presidency it would address the issue with Washington.

Release
On December 16, 2008, Hadj Boudella, Mustafa Idr, and Mohammed Nechle were released to Bosnia.

On March 3, 2009, El Khabar reported that the Bush administration forced Idr and the other two men to sign undertakings that they would not sue the US government for their kidnapping, before they would be released.

See also
Algerian Six

References

External links

Washington Post: At Guantanamo, caught in a legal trap
USA Today: Detainees cases show another side of Gitmo
NPR: listening in on detainee hearings
CITY ON THE HILL OR PRISON ON THE BAY? THE MISTAKES OF GUANTANAMO AND THE DECLINE OF AMERICA’S IMAGE
Scandal of six held in Guantanamo even after Bush plot claim is dropped
After 7 Years, Judge Orders Release of Guantánamo Kidnap Victims Andy Worthington November 25, 2008
Judge Leon’s unclassified opinion
Algerians, freed from Guantanamo, still paying the price

Living people
1965 births
Algerian emigrants to Bosnia and Herzegovina
Guantanamo detainees known to have been released
People subject to extraordinary rendition by the United States
Combatant Status Review Tribunals
Bosnia and Herzegovina people of Algerian descent